Snehikkan Oru Pennu is a 1978 Indian Malayalam-language film, directed by N. Sukumaran Nair. The film stars Thikkurissy Sukumaran Nair, Sankaradi, Sreelatha Namboothiri and Vasanthi. The film has musical score by G. Devarajan. The film also marked the on-screen debut of Sangita Madhavan Nair as a child artiste.

Cast
 Thikkurissy Sukumaran Nair
 Sankaradi
 Sreelatha Namboothiri
 Vasanthi
 Bahadoor
 M. G. Soman
 Meena
 Sangita Madhavan Nair

Soundtrack
The music was composed by G. Devarajan and the lyrics were written by Yusufali Kechery.

References

External links
 

1978 films
1970s Malayalam-language films